Isotta Nogarola (1418–1466) was an Italian writer and intellectual who is said to be the first major female humanist and one of the most important humanists of the Italian Renaissance. Her most influential work was a literary dialogue, De pari aut impari Evae atque Adae peccato (trans. Dialogue on the Equal or Unequal Sin of Adam and Eve) written in 1451 in which she discussed the relative sinfulness of Adam and Eve. She argued that woman could not be held both to be weaker in nature and to be more culpable in original sin. Therefore, by a reductio ad absurdum argument women's weakness could be disproved. Nogarola also wrote Latin poems, orations, further dialogues, and letters, twenty-six of which survive.

Early intellectual life
Isotta Nogarola was born in Verona, Italy. She is the daughter of Leonardo Nogarola and Bianca Borromeo, and the niece of the Latin poet Angela Nogarola.  The family were well to-do, and the couple had ten children, four boys and six girls. Isotta's mother, Bianca Borromeo ensured that the children all received fine humanist educations, although she was herself illiterate. Two of her daughters, Isotta and her younger sister Ginevra, became renowned for their classical studies, although Ginevra gave up her humanist writing upon her marriage in 1438.  Nogarola's early letters demonstrate her familiarity with Latin and Greek authors, including Cicero, Plutarch and Diogenes Laertius, as well as Petronius and Aulus Gellius. The girls, as were their male counterparts, were taught the rhetoric necessary for public speaking, and many of them delivered Latin speeches in public and conducted debates in Latin in their correspondence with other scholars, as was the practice among well-educated men of that era and necessary for anyone seeking recognition in learned circles.

Nogarola's first tutor was Martino Rizzoni, who was himself taught by Guarino da Verona, one of the leading humanists at that time. Nogarola proved an extremely able student, attaining respect for her eloquence in Latin, and by the age of 18, she had become famous.

Hostile reception of her humanistic work
The reception of her activities was condescending, with her work considered primarily to be that of a woman and not belonging to the intellectual world into which she sought entry: Niccolo Venier thought the whole female sex should rejoice and consecrate statues to Isotta as the ancient Egyptians had to Isis. Giorgio Bevilaqua claimed never before to have met a learned woman. For her own part, Nogarola was concerned that her fame did not come from the sheer volume of intelligence she seemed to possess, but from the novelty of her gender, and despite her erudition had little choice but to defer to the contemporary social norms by deprecating herself as an ignorant woman. 

Nonetheless, in 1438, after receiving praise from Guarino da Verona, to whom a friend had written the year before, Nogarola wrote herself, calling Guarino a "wellspring of virtue and probity," and terming them heroic, she a Cicero to his Cato, she a Socrates to his Plato. This news spread throughout Verona, which inspired much ridicule from women in the city. A year passed without a reply, and she wrote again to Guarino, saying:

"Why... was I born a woman, to be scorned by men in words and deeds? I ask myself this question in solitude... Your unfairness in not writing to me has caused me much suffering, that there could be no greater suffering... You yourself said there was no goal I could not achieve. But now that nothing has turned out as it should have, my joy has given way to sorrow... For they jeer at me throughout the city, the women mock me."

This time, Guarino da Verona replied in a letter saying: "I believed and trusted that your soul was manly...But now you seem so humbled, so abject, and so truly a woman, that you demonstrate none of the estimable qualities I thought you possessed." Upon the death of her father the next year she travelled with her family to Venice, year where she remained until 1441. However anonymous accusations were made against her, alleging incest, male and female homosexuality and licentiousness. “An eloquent woman is never chaste,” was one such made against her. All such accusations were scandalous for a woman in Venice at that time.

Retreat to her property in Verona and religion 
Confronted with this hostile reception Isotta appears to have decided that devoting herself to literary studies meant the sacrifice of friendship, fame, comfort, and sexuality, and in 1441 returned to her property at Verona to live quietly, possibly with the company of her mother. She cut short her career as a secular humanist and turned instead to the study of sacred letter. Here it was that in 1451 that she published her most famous and perhaps most influential work De pari aut impari Evae atque Adae peccato (trans. Dialogue on the Equal or Unequal Sin of Adam and Eve).

Isotta died in 1466, aged 48. She was honoured posthumously by two sonnets praising her chastity, but not her learning.

Major works 
As well as her famous dialogues her works include a biography of St Jerome, a letter urging a Crusade (1459), and a consolatory letter to a father on the death of his child.

References

Further reading

Carmel McCallum-Barry (2016), 'Learned women of the Renaissance and Early Modern period: the relevance of their scholarship', in Women Classical Scholars: Unsealing the Fountain from the Renaissance to Jacqueline de Romilly, ed. Rosie Wyles and Edith Hall, 29-47. Oxford: Oxford University Press.
Some full texts of her work in Angela Nogarola (ca. 1400) and Isotta Nogarola (1418-1466): Thieves of Language." in Women Writing Latin: From Roman Antiquity to Early Modern Europe, v. 3. Early Modern Women Writing Latin, ed. Laurie J. Churchill, Phyllis R. Brown, and Jane E. Jeffrey, 11–30. New York: Routledge.

External links

1418 births
1466 deaths
Italian Renaissance humanists
Writers from Verona
15th-century Italian women writers
Italian feminists
15th-century Latin writers